Newstead Christian School is a K-10 Christian school outside Launceston, Tasmania.

References

Private primary schools in Tasmania
High schools in Tasmania
Schools in Launceston, Tasmania
Educational institutions established in 1995
Nondenominational Christian schools in Tasmania
1995 establishments in Australia